The Musée Binger de Zaranou is a museum located in Ivory Coast. It is located in Zaranou, Comoé District.

References

See also 
 List of museums in Ivory Coast

Museums in Ivory Coast
Buildings and structures in Comoé District
Indénié-Djuablin